Joseph Sinde Warioba (born September 3, 1940) served as Prime Minister of Tanzania from 1985 to 1990. Furthermore, he served concurrently as the country's Vice President. He has also served as a judge on the East African Court of Justice, and as chairman of the Tanzanian Constitutional Review Commission.

He was born in Bunda District of Mara Region in Tanzania. He graduated from the University of East Africa in Dar es Salaam, Tanzania in 1966. From 1966 to 1968, he served as state attorney in Dar es Salaam, and from 1968 to 1970, as solicitor for the City Council. In 1970, he graduated from The Hague Academy of International Law. From 1976 to 1983, he served as the attorney general of Tanzania. From 1983 until his election as prime minister, he served as minister of justice.

Following his tenure as prime minister, he served as a judge on the Hamburg, Germany-based International Tribunal for the Law of the Sea from 1996 to 1999. Furthermore, in 1996, President Benjamin Mkapa appointed him as chairman of the Presidential Commission Against Government Corruption, better known as the Warioba Commission.

Warioba was chosen to lead the Commonwealth Observer Group in the April 2007 Nigerian elections. He gave a positive assessment of the elections, deeming them to be progress while also saying that there were irregularities.

Warioba was appointed in November 2016 by the President of Tanzania John Magufuli as the Chancellor of Sokoine University of Agriculture in Morogoro, Tanzania.

References

1940 births
Living people
People from Bunda District
Chama Cha Mapinduzi politicians
Prime Ministers of Tanzania
Attorneys General of Tanzania
Vice-presidents of Tanzania
The Hague Academy of International Law people
20th-century Tanzanian judges
University of Dar es Salaam alumni
International Tribunal for the Law of the Sea judges
East African Court of Justice judges
Tanzanian judges of United Nations courts and tribunals
Sokoine University of Agriculture
Tanzanian judges of international courts and tribunals
21st-century Tanzanian judges
Tanzanian Roman Catholics